Throughout August 2003, various teams prepared for the Rugby World Cup in Australia with a short series of test matches, and involving the RBS Six Nations sides. In addition, South Fiji toured New Zealand and South America and Samoa played two match with New Zealand provincial team . Argentina, South Africa played other matches (not international)

The tests are effectively a replacement for the usual Autumn international series in November which does not take place in World Cup years.

Meanwhile there were two tournaments involving teams that were preparing for the World Cup.

 The 2003 Tri Nations, with Australia, New Zealand, South Africa
 The Pan American championship with Argentina, Canada, United States, Uruguay

There were also a tour of Fiji in New Zealand and South America

Note: this article does not include international results not involving at least one side who had qualified for the 2003 World Cup

26 July 

Canada: 15. James Pritchard, 14. Sean Fauth, 13. Nik Witkowski, 12.John Cannon, 11. Winston Stanley, 10. Bobby Ross, 9. Morgan Williams, 8. Kevin Tkachuk, 7.Mark Lawson, 6. Garth Cooke, 5. Mike James, 4. Ryan Banks (c), 3. Colin Yukes, 2. Adam van Staveren, 1. Phil Murphy; Replacements: 17. Pat Dunkley, 18.Jim Douglas, 19. Jeff Reid, 20. Ed Fairhurst, 21. Ryan Smith, 22. Marco di Girolamo; Unused: 16. Kevin Wirachowski
NZ Māori: 15. Christian Cullen, 14. Joe Maddock, 13. Rico Gear, 12. Norm Berryman, 11. Shayne Austin, 10. Willie Walker, 9.David Gibson, 8. Ron Cribb, 7. Troy Flavell, 6. Germaine Anaha, 5. Paul Tito (c), 4. Kris Ormsby, 3. Carl Hayman, 2. Slade McFarland, 1. Joe McDonnell; Replacements: 16. Bryce Robins, 17. Glen Jackson, 18. Brendan Haami, 19. Wayne McEntee, 20.Warren Smith, 21. Deacon Manu

2 August 

Canada: 15. James Pritchard, 14.John Cannon, 13. Marco di Girolamo, 12.Matt King, 11. Winston Stanley, 10. Ryan Smith, 9. Morgan Williams, 8. Kevin Tkachuk, 7. Pat Dunkley, 6. Garth Cooke, 5. Mike James, 4.Jim Douglas, 3. Colin Yukes, 2. Adam van Staveren, 1. Ryan Banks (c); Replacements: 16.Mark Lawson, 17. Kevin Wirachowski, 18. Phil Murphy, 19. Ed Fairhurst, 22. Nik Witkowski; Unused: 20. Bobby Ross, 21. Sean Fauth
NZ Māori: 15. Christian Cullen, 14. Joe Maddock, 13. Rico Gear, 12. Norm Berryman, 11. Shayne Austin, 10. Willie Walker, 9. Brendan Haami, 8. Ron Cribb, 7. Troy Flavell, 6. Wayne McEntee, 5. Paul Tito (c), 4. Kris Ormsby, 3. Carl Hayman, 2. Slade McFarland, 1. Joe McDonnell; Replacements: 16. Glen Jackson, 17. Germaine Anaha, 18.Warren Smith, 19. Deacon Manu, 20. Scott Linklater

12 August

15 August

16 August

Ireland: 15. Geordan Murphy, 14. Tyrone Howe, 13. Brian O'Driscoll, 12. Kevin Maggs, 11. Anthony Horgan, 10. David Humphreys, 9. Peter Stringer, 1. Reggie Corrigan, 2. Keith Wood (c), 3. Simon Best, 4. Malcolm O'Kelly, 5. Alan Quinlan, 6. Paul O'Connell, 7. Keith Gleeson, 8. Anthony Foley; Replacements: Shane Byrne, Justin Fitzpatrick, Donncha O'Callaghan, David Wallace, Guy Easterby, Gordon D'Arcy, Girvan Dempsey 
Wales: 15. Nick Robinson, 14. Garan Evans, 13. Jamie Robinson, 12. Iestyn Harris , 11. Gareth Thomas (c), 10. Ceri Sweeney, 9. Dwayne Peel, 8. Alix Popham, 7. Richard Parks, 6. Rhys Oakley, 5. Gareth Llewellyn, 4. Michael Owen, 3. Ben Evans, 2. Mefin Davies, 1. Duncan Jones; Replacements: Huw Bennett, Gethin Jenkins, Vernon Cooper, Robin Sowden-Taylor, Andy Williams, Andy Marinos, Nathan Brew; Unused: Robin Sowden-Taylor, Andy Williams, Andy Marinos, Nathan Brew

18 August

22 August 

France: Pepito Elhorga, 14. Aurélien Rougerie, 13. Yannick Jauzion, 12. Damien Traille, 11. Christophe Dominici, 10. Frédéric Michalak, 9. Fabien Galthié (c), 8. Jean-Jacques Crenca, 7. Yannick Bru, 6. Sylvain Marconnet, 5. Fabien Pelous, 4. Serge Betsen, 3. Jérôme Thion, 2. Olivier Magne, 1. Imanol Harinordoquy; Replacements: 16. Raphaël Ibañez, 17. Olivier Milloud, 18. David Auradou, 19. Christian Labit, 20. Dimitri Yachvili, 21. Gérald Merceron, 22. Brian Liebenberg 
Romania: 15. Dan Dumbrava, 14. Cristian Sauan, 13. Valentin Maftei, 12. Romeo Gontineac (c), 11. Gabriel Brezoianu, 10. Ionut Tofan, 9. Lucian Sirbu, 8. Ovidiu Tonita, 7. Costica Mersoiu, 6. George Chiriac, 5. Cristian Petre, 4. Sorin Socol, 3. Marcel Socaciu, 2. Marius Tincu, 1. Petru Balan; Replacements: 16. Petrisor Toderasc, 17. Cezar Popescu, 18. Augustin Petrechei, 19. Alex Tudori, 20. Cristian Podea, 22. Mihai Vioreanu; Unused: 21. Iulian Andrei

23 August 

Scotland: Ben Hinshelwood, 14. Simon Danielli, 13. James McLaren, 12. Andrew Henderson, 11. Kenny Logan, 10. Gordon Ross, 9. Mike Blair, 8. Tom Smith, 7. Robbie Russell, 6. Bruce Douglas, 5. Scott Murray (c), 4. Jason White, 3. Nathan Hines, 2. Jon Petrie, 1. Simon Taylor; Replacements: 16. Gordon Bulloch, 17. Gordon McIlwham, 18. Iain Fullarton, 19. Martin Leslie, 21. Chris Paterson, 22. Brendan Laney; Unused: 20. Graeme Beveridge
Italy: 15. Gert Peens, 14. Nicola Mazzucato, 13. Andrea Masi, 12. Cristian Stoica, 11. Mirco Bergamasco, 10. Ramiro Pez, 9. Alessandro Troncon (c), 8. Matthew Phillips, 7. Scott Palmer, 6. Maurizio Zaffiri, 5. Marco Bortolami, 4. Santiago Dellapè, 3. Salvatore Perugini, 2. Carlo Festuccia, 1. Andrea Lo Cicero; Replacements: 16. Fabio Ongaro, 17. Ramiro Martinez-Frugoni, 18. Sergio Parisse, 19. Mauro Bergamasco, 21. Francesco Mazzariol, 22. Gonzalo Canale; Unused: 20. Juan Manuel Queirolo

Wales: Rhys Williams, 14. Mark Jones, 13. Mark Taylor, 12. Sonny Parker, 11. Gareth Thomas, 10. Stephen Jones (c), 9. Gareth Cooper, 1. Iestyn Thomas, 2. Robin McBryde, 3. Gethin Jenkins, 4. Robert Sidoli, 5. Colin Charvis, 6. Chris Wyatt, 7. Martyn Williams, 8. Dafydd Jones; Replacements: 16. Gareth Williams, 17. Adam R.Jones, 18. Jonathan Thomas, 19. Gavin Thomas; Unused: 20. Mike Phillips, 21. Gavin Henson, 22. Tom Shanklin
England: 15. Dan Scarbrough, 14. James Simpson-Daniel, 13. Jamie Noon, 12. Stuart Abbott, 11. Dan Luger, 10. Alex King, 9. Andy Gomarsall, 8. Joe Worsley, 7. Lewis Moody, 6. Martin Corry, 5. Simon Shaw, 4. Danny Grewcock, 3. Julian White, 2. Mark Regan, 1. Jason Leonard (c); Replacements: 16. Dorian West, 17. Will Green, 18. Steve Borthwick, 19. Alex Sanderson, 21. Dave Walder, 22. Ollie Smith; Unused: 20. Austin Healey

26 August

27 August 

Wales: Gavin Henson, 14. Nathan Brew, 13. Matthew Watkins, 12. Andy Marinos, 11. Shane Williams, 10. Nick Robinson, 9. Mike Phillips, 1. Paul James, 2. Mefin Davies (c), 3. Ben Evans, 4. Brent Cockbain, 5. Ian Gough, 6. Jonathan Thomas, 7. Gavin Thomas, 8. Alix Popham; Replacements: 16. Paul Young, 17. Chris Anthony, 18. Deiniol Jones, 19. James Bater, 20. Gareth Wyatt, 21. Jon Bryant, 22. Andy Williams 
Romania: 15. Dan Dumbrava, 14. Cristian Sauan, 13. Valentin Maftei, 12. Romeo Gontineac (c), 11. Gabriel Brezoianu, 10. Ionut Tofan, 9. Lucian Sirbu, 8. Ovidiu Tonita, 7. Costica Mersoiu, 6. George Chiriac, 5. Cristian Petre, 4. Sorin Socol, 3. Marcel Socaciu, 2. Marius Tincu , 1. Petru Balan ; Replacements: 16. Dan Tudosa, 17. Petrisor Toderasc, 18. Cezar Popescu, 19. Augustin Petrechei, 20. Alex Tudori, 21. Iulian Andrei, 22. Ion Teodorescu

30 August

Ireland: Girvan Dempsey, 14. John Kelly, 13. Brian O'Driscoll (c), 12. Rob Henderson, 11. Denis Hickie, 10. David Humphreys, 9. Guy Easterby, 8. Marcus Horan, 7. Shane Byrne, 6. Reggie Corrigan, 5. Gary Longwell, 4. Simon Easterby, 3. Leo Cullen, 2. Eric Miller, 1. Victor Costello; Replacements: 16. Paul Shields, 17. Justin Fitzpatrick, 18. Donncha O'Callaghan, 19. Kieron Dawson, 20. Brian O'Meara, 21. Geordan Murphy, 22. Jonny Bell 
Italy: 15. Gert Peens, 14. Nicola Mazzucato, 13. Cristian Stoica, 12. Matteo Barbini, 11. Diego Sacca, 10. Francesco Mazzariol, 9. Alessandro Troncon (c), 8. Sergio Parisse, 7. Mauro Bergamasco, 6. Andrea de Rossi, 5. Mark Giacheri, 4. Cristian Bezzi, 3. Martin Castrogiovanni, 2. Fabio Ongaro, 1. Andrea Lo Cicero; Replacements: 16. Carlo Festuccia, 18. Aaron Persico, 19. Matthew Phillips, 22. Andrea Masi; Unused: 17. Ramiro Martinez-Frugoni, 20. Matteo Mazzantini, 21. Ramiro Pez

France: Nicolas Brusque, 14. Aurélien Rougerie, 13. Yannick Jauzion, 12. Damien Traille, 11. Christophe Dominici, 10. Frédéric Michalak, 9. Fabien Galthié (c), 8. Jean-Jacques Crenca, 7. Yannick Bru, 6. Sylvain Marconnet, 5. Fabien Pelous, 4. Serge Betsen, 3. Jérôme Thion, 2. Olivier Magne, 1. Imanol Harinordoquy; Replacements: 16. Raphaël Ibañez, 17. Olivier Milloud, 18. David Auradou, 19. Sébastien Chabal, 20. Patrick Tabacco, 22. Brian Liebenberg; Unused: 21. Xavier Garbajosa
England: 15. Iain Balshaw, 14. Josh Lewsey, 13. Ollie Smith, 12. Mike Tindall, 11. Ben Cohen, 10. Paul Grayson, 9. Austin Healey, 8. Alex Sanderson, 7. Lewis Moody, 6. Martin Corry, 5. Danny Grewcock, 4. Steve Borthwick, 3. Julian White, 2. Dorian West (c), 1. Graham Rowntree; Replacements: 16. Steve Thompson, 17. Jason Leonard, 18. Simon Shaw, 22. Jamie Noon, 22. Jamie Noon; Unused: 19. Andy Hazell, 21. Dave Walder

Wales: 15. Garan Evans, 14. Jamie Robinson, 13. Tom Shanklin, 12. Iestyn Harris, 11. Matthew Watkins, 10. Ceri Sweeney, 9. Dwayne Peel, 1. Duncan Jones, 2. Robin McBryde, 3. Adam R. Jones, 4. Vernon Cooper, 5. Michael Owen, 6. Colin Charvis (c), 7. Richard Parks, 8. Alix Popham; Replacements: 16. Huw Bennett, 18. Gareth Llewellyn, 19. Rhys Oakley, 22. Hal Luscombe; Unused: 17. Ben Evans, 20. Mike Phillips, 21. Nick Robinson
Scotland: 15. Glenn Metcalfe, 14. Rory Kerr, 13. Andy Craig, 12. Brendan Laney, 11. Simon Danielli, 10. Gregor Townsend, 9. Graeme Beveridge, 8. Jon Petrie, 7. Andrew Mower, 6. Martin Leslie, 5. Stuart Grimes, 4. Scott Murray (c), 3. Bruce Douglas, 2. Gordon Bulloch, 1. Gavin Kerr; Replacements: 16. Dougie Hall, 17. Gordon McIlwham, 18. Nathan Hines, 19. Andrew Dall, 22. Chris Paterson; Unused: 20. Mike Blair, 21. Andrew Henderson

6 September

Italy: 15. Gonzalo Canale, 14. Mirco Bergamasco, 13. Cristian Stoica, 12. Nanni Raineri, 11. Nicola Mazzucato, 10. Ramiro Pez, 9. Alessandro Troncon (c), 1. Andrea Lo Cicero, 2. Fabio Ongaro, 3. Martin Castrogiovanni, 4. Santiago Dellapè, 5. Andrea de Rossi, 6. Marco Bortolami, 7. Aaron Persico, 8. Sergio Parisse; Replacements: 16. Carlo Festuccia, 17. Salvatore Perugini, 18. Carlo Checchinato, 19. Mauro Bergamasco, 20. Juan Manuel Queirolo, 22. Gert Peens; Unused: 21. Vincenzo Zullo
Georgia: 15. Bessik Khamashuridze , 14. Malkhaz Urjukashvili, 13. Tedo Zibzibadze, 12. Irakli Giorgadze, 11. Irakli Machkhaneli, 10. Paliko Jimsheladze, 9. Irakli Abuseridze, 8. Ilia Zedginidze (c), 7. Gregoire Yachvili, 6. Giorgi Chkhaidze, 5. Victor Didebulidze, 4. Zurab Mtchedlishvili, 3. Aleko Margvelashvili , 2. Akvsenti Giorgadze, 1. Avto Kopaliani; Replacements: 16. Goderdzi Shvelidze, 17. David Dadunashvili, 18. Vano Nadiradze , 19. Grigol Labadze , 20. Irakli Modebadze, 21. David Kiknadze

England: 15. Jason Robinson, 14. Iain Balshaw, 13. Will Greenwood, 12. Stuart Abbott, 11. Ben Cohen, 10. Jonny Wilkinson, 9. Kyran Bracken, 8. Trevor Woodman, 7. Steve Thompson, 6. Julian White, 5. Martin Johnson (c), 4. Richard Hill, 3. Ben Kay, 2. Neil Back, 1. Martin Corry; Replacements: 16. Dorian West, 17. Jason Leonard, 18. Simon Shaw, 19. Lewis Moody, 20. Matt Dawson, 21. Paul Grayson, 22. Josh Lewsey 
France: 15. Clément Poitrenaud, 14. Xavier Garbajosa, 13. Yannick Jauzion, 12. Brian Liebenberg, 11. Christophe Dominici, 10. Gérald Merceron, 9. Dimitri Yachvili, 8. Christian Labit, 7. Patrick Tabacco, 6. Sébastien Chabal, 5. Olivier Brouzet, 4. David Auradou, 3. Jean-Baptiste Poux, 2. Raphaël Ibañez (c), 1. Olivier Milloud; Replacements: 16. Yannick Bru, 17. Sylvain Marconnet, 18. Fabien Pelous, 19. Imanol Harinordoquy, 20. Olivier Magne, 22. Aurélien Rougerie; Unused: 21. Frédéric Michalak

Scotland: 15. Glenn Metcalfe, 14. Chris Paterson, 13. Andy Craig, 12. Andrew Henderson, 11. Kenny Logan, 10. Gordon Ross, 9. Mike Blair, 8. Allan Jacobsen, 7. Gordon Bulloch (c), 6. Gordon McIlwham, 5. Stuart Grimes, 4. Ross Beattie, 3. Nathan Hines, 2. Andrew Mower, 1. Simon Taylor; Replacements: 16. Robbie Russell, 17. Matthew Proudfoot, 18. Jon Petrie, 19. Iain Fullarton, 21. James McLaren, 22. Simon Webster; Unused: 20. Graeme Beveridge
Ireland: 15. Geordan Murphy, 14. Anthony Horgan, 13. Brian O'Driscoll, 12. Kevin Maggs, 11. Denis Hickie, 10. Ronan O'Gara, 9. Peter Stringer, 8. Victor Costello, 7. Eric Miller, 6. David Wallace, 5. Paul O'Connell, 4. Malcolm O'Kelly, 3. Reggie Corrigan, 2. Keith Wood (c), 1. Marcus Horan; Replacements: 16. Shane Byrne, 17. Simon Best, 18. Simon Easterby, 19. Kieron Dawson, 20. Guy Easterby, 21. David Humphreys, 22. Girvan Dempsey

12 September

16 September

19 September

21 September

Notes and references 

2003
Warm-up tests
2003–04 in European rugby union
2003 in Oceanian rugby union
2003 in South American rugby union
2003 in Canadian rugby union
2003 in South African rugby union